Charlotte Best (born 7 March 1985) is a retired English middle-distance runner. She represented Great Britain in 1500 metres at the 2010 World Indoor Championships without advancing from the first round. In addition she won bronze medals at the 2007 and 2011 Summer Universiades.

International competitions

Personal bests
Outdoor
400 metres – 54.97 (Loughborough 2007)
800 metres – 2:01.50 (Bangkok 2007)
1000 metres – 2:39.68 (Oslo 2012)
1500 metres – 4:16.57 (Watford 2007)
One mile – 4:45.72 (Sheffield 2005)

Indoor
600 metres – 1:34.89 (Birmingham 2006)
800 metres – 2:05.25 (Sheffield 2012)
1000 metres – 2:49.96 (Birmingham 2006)
1500 metres – 4:12.29 (Birmingham 2009)
One mile – 4:32.29 (Birmingham 2010)

References

1985 births
Living people
English female middle-distance runners
Universiade medalists in athletics (track and field)
Universiade bronze medalists for Great Britain
Competitors at the 2011 Summer Universiade
Medalists at the 2007 Summer Universiade